The 2014 Bethune–Cookman Wildcats football team represented Bethune-Cookman University in the 2014 NCAA Division I FCS football season. They were led by fifth-year head coach Brian Jenkins and played their home games at Municipal Stadium. They were a member of the Mid-Eastern Athletic Conference (MEAC. They finished the season 9–3, 6–2 in MEAC play to finish in a five-way tie for the MEAC championship. However, they did not earn the conference's automatic bid to the FCS Playoffs and did not receive an at-large bid.

On December 16, Jenkins resigned to take the head coaching position at Alabama State. He finished at Bethune-Cookman with a five year record of 46–14.

Schedule
Source: Schedule

Ranking movements

References

Bethune-Cookman
Bethune–Cookman Wildcats football seasons
Mid-Eastern Athletic Conference football champion seasons